Upper Green Valley is a valley in the Cuyamaca Mountains in San Diego County, California. The Sweetwater River has its source at the top of Upper Green Valley.

History
Upper Green Valley was a part of a pathway between the California coast in the vicinity of San Diego and the Colorado River. U.S. Army couriers used it during and after the Mexican–American War. As part of the San Antonio–San Diego Mail Line, mules carried passengers 18 miles up and down Upper Green Valley, Oriflamme Canyon, Vallecito Wash, Vallecito Creek and Carrizo Creek between Lassiter's Ranch and Carrizo Creek Station.

References

Valleys of San Diego County, California
Cuyamaca Mountains
East County (San Diego County)